Girolamo Vascheri, O.F.M. was a Roman Catholic prelate who served as Bishop of Guardialfiera (1524–1533) and Bishop of Shkodrë (1522–1524).

Biography
Girolamo Vascheri was ordained a priest in the Order of Friars Minor.
On 3 October 1522, he was appointed during the papacy of Pope Adrian VI as Bishop of Shkodrë.
On 19 September 1524, he was appointed during the papacy of Pope Clement VII as Bishop of Guardialfiera.
He served as Bishop of Guardialfiera until his resignation in 1533.

References

External links and additional sources
 (for Chronology of Bishops) 
 (for Chronology of Bishops) 
 (for Chronology of Bishops) 
 (for Chronology of Bishops) 

16th-century Italian Roman Catholic bishops
Bishops appointed by Pope Adrian VI
Bishops appointed by Pope Clement VII
Franciscan bishops
16th-century Albanian Roman Catholic bishops